The Cougal Spiral is a heritage-listed single track railway tunnel and spiral feature of the North Coast railway line in Australia that connects New South Wales with Queensland under the Border Ranges near Richmond Gap in the Kyogle Council local government area of New South Wales, Australia. It was built during 1930. It is also known as the Border Loop railway formation and landscape, Cougal To Border Loop and Railway Spiral and Landscape. The property was added to the New South Wales State Heritage Register on 2 April 1999.

The railway line needs to climb at a steady ruling gradient from Kyogle to the summit at a tunnel at the border between the two states. The border is also at the watershed.

Description
Climbing almost non-stop at the ruling grade of 1 in 66 or 1.5% (compensated) the line has almost continuous curves of  radius. Near Cougal, the alignment finally runs out of valley, and has nowhere to go. Fortunately a convenient hill allows the line to circle back on itself so that it climbs  without having to make any forward progress.

The common name of 'Border Loop' for the Cougal Spiral has itself led to ambiguity in descriptions of the feature itself. The single rail line heading north makes a spiral round this hill, mostly comprising surface track plus two short curved tunnels (one where it passes under itself, the other through a small spur in the hillside).

Soon after the Border Tunnel under the watershed is reached the line curves westward and descends on the other side. A lower summit, perhaps without the spiral, would have been possible with a considerably longer and more expensive summit tunnel, with the possibility of problems with fumes for both the original steam locomotives and the replacement diesel engines.

The Cougal Spiral is easily viewed from parts of the Lions Road. The structure has been heritage listed due to its historical, scientific and architectural rarity. It opened on 29 August 1930 as part of the extension of the North Coast line from Kyogle to South Brisbane.

The Cougal Railway Spiral and Landscape consists of the following elements:

The heritage feature is formed by the whole section of line from Cougal to the Border Tunnel.

History 
The 'Border Loop' opened on 29 August 1930, connecting New South Wales and Queensland by rail beneath Richmond Gap.

Heritage listing 
As at 19 July 2013, the Cougal to Border Loop section of the North Coast Line was a notable engineering achievement, revealing a twentieth century engineering solution that allows trains to pass through the steep topography at the NSW/Queensland border.

The 'Border Loop' railway formation and landscape was listed on the New South Wales State Heritage Register on 2 April 1999 having satisfied the following criteria.

The place is important in demonstrating the course, or pattern, of cultural or natural history in New South Wales.

The completion of the Cougal Spiral to Border Tunnel section of the North Coast Railway was a major engineering feat in the first half of the twentieth century, being one of several major engineering projects in NSW that allowed continuous railway access between Sydney and Brisbane.

The place is important in demonstrating aesthetic characteristics and/or a high degree of creative or technical achievement in New South Wales.

The combination of tunnels, crossing loops, the underbridge and spiral together form a technically significant example of an innovative and successful railway engineering solution.

The place possesses uncommon, rare or endangered aspects of the cultural or natural history of New South Wales.

The railway spiral at 'Border Loop' is one of only two railway spirals in NSW.

See also 

 List of tunnels in Australia
 Rail transport in New South Wales

References

Attribution

External links

Northern Rivers
Rail infrastructure in New South Wales
Railway tunnels in New South Wales
Railway tunnels in Queensland
Transport infrastructure completed in 1930
Tunnels completed in 1930
New South Wales State Heritage Register
Kyogle Council
Railway bridges in New South Wales
Articles incorporating text from the New South Wales State Heritage Register
1930 establishments in Australia
North Coast railway line, New South Wales